Jordan Stewart (born 5 March 1996) is a Scottish footballer who plays as a midfielder for Albion Rovers. He has also played for St Mirren, Annan Athletic and Clyde.

Career

St Mirren
Stewart began his career at St Mirren. He was an unused substitute for one of their 2013–14 Scottish Premiership matches, a goalless home draw with Hibernian on 23 November 2013. He made his debut on 23 May 2015, playing 14 minutes as a substitute for Jeroen Tesselaar at the end of a 1–0 defeat at Hamilton Academical.

On 18 August 2015 he started a game for the first time, in the second round of the Scottish Challenge Cup, and scored the equaliser as his team came from behind to win 2–1 at Annan Athletic. A week later in the second round of the Scottish League Cup, he was taken off in a stretcher after a challenge from Livingston's Danny Mullen which resulted in his dismissal; St Mirren lost the game 2–3 at home.

In May 2016, Stewart graduated from the club's academy by signing a one-year professional contract. He moved on loan to Annan Athletic in January 2017. He was released by St Mirren at the end of his contract in May 2017.

Clyde
In June 2017, Stewart signed a one-year contract with Scottish League Two side Clyde. Stewart extended his contractor for a further year in May 2018, having made over thirty appearances for the club. After helping the club gain promotion to Scottish League One, Stewart's contract was not renewed.

Albion Rovers
On 29 May 2019, Stewart signed for Albion Rovers.

Career statistics

References

External links

Living people
1996 births
Scottish footballers
Association football midfielders
St Mirren F.C. players
Annan Athletic F.C. players
Clyde F.C. players
Albion Rovers F.C. players
Scottish Professional Football League players